The Angelina River is formed by the junction of Barnhardt and Shawnee creeks  northwest of Laneville in southwest central Rusk County, Texas.

It passes under US 59 via former Angelina River Bridge.

The Sam Rayburn Reservoir is on the southern part of the river.

History

The river was named for a native Hasinai girl whom Spanish missionaries called Angelina. It was well known to Spanish and French explorers and to missionaries in East Texas. Spanish land grants along the stream date back to the later eighteenth century, and there was considerable settlement in the area during the Mexican period.

In 1832, the Battle of Nacogdoches spilled over onto the Angelina, when James Bowie ambushed the fleeing Mexican army at this river.

River traffic on the Angelina began to die in the 1880s with the arrival of the railroads. By 1900, the stream was no longer navigable. Farming and clear-cutting by the growing lumber industry in the river's watershed caused the river to silt up, and numerous sandbars formed along its course.

See also 
 List of rivers of Texas
 Angelina College

Notes

External links
 

Rivers of Texas
Rivers of Rusk County, Texas
Rivers of Cherokee County, Texas
Rivers of Nacogdoches County, Texas
Rivers of Angelina County, Texas
Rivers of San Augustine County, Texas
Rivers of Jasper County, Texas